The De Goeje Mountains is a mountain range in the Sipaliwini District of Suriname. It is named after Claudius de Goeje.

References 

Mountain ranges of Suriname